Giridih Assembly constituency   is an assembly constituency in  the Indian state of Jharkhand.

Members of Assembly 
1952: Krishnaballabh Sahai, INC
1957: Kamakhya Narain Singh, CNPSPJP
1962: Raghunandan Ram, Indian National Congress
1967: Raghunandan Ram, Indian National Congress
1969: Chaturanan Mishra, Communist Party of India
1972: Chaturanan Mishra, Communist Party of India
1977: Chaturanan Mishra, Communist Party of India
1980: Urmila Debi, Indian National Congress
1985: Om Lal Azad, Communist Party of India
1990: Jyotindra Prasad, Indian National Congress
1995: Chandra Mohan Prasad, Bharatiya Janata Party
2000: Chandra Mohan Prasad, Bharatiya Janata Party
2005: Munna Lal, Jharkhand Mukti Morcha
2009: Nirbhay Sahabadi , Jharkhand Vikas Morcha
2014: Nirbhay Sahabadi, Bharatiya Janata Party
2019: Sudivya Kumar, Jharkhand Mukti Morcha

Election Results

2019

See also
Vidhan Sabha
List of states of India by type of legislature

References

Assembly constituencies of Jharkhand
Giridih district